Captain Poison (Spanish: Capitán Veneno) is a 1943 Argentine historical comedy drama film directed by Henri Martinent and starring Luis Sandrini, Rosa Rosen and Bertha Moss. It is based on a novel of the same title by Pedro Antonio de Alarcón. A 1951 Spanish film Captain Poison was also based on the novel.

The film's sets were designed by the art director Juan Manuel Concado.

Cast
 Luis Sandrini as Jorge de Cordoba  
 Rosa Rosen as Angelica  
 Aline Marney 
 Joaquín García León 
 Bertha Moss 
 Héctor Quintanilla as Médico  
 María Ramos 
 Gregorio Verdi 
 Antonio Ballerini
 Lalo Bosch
 José Krause
 Vicente Álvarez

External links
 

1943 films
1940s Spanish-language films
Argentine black-and-white films
Films based on works by Pedro Antonio de Alarcón
1940s historical comedy-drama films
Films set in the 19th century
Argentine historical comedy-drama films
1943 comedy films
1943 drama films
1940s Argentine films